Whetstone Point is a summit in the U.S. state of Oregon.

Whetstone Point was named for the nearby supply of rock from which whetstones were fashioned.

References

Mountains of Jackson County, Oregon
Mountains of Oregon